Picavet may refer to:

François Picavet (1851–1921), French philosopher
Picavet suspension, a type of suspension used in kite aerial photography